Éric Ferber (born 8 December 1961) is a French sculptor known for his large-scale sculptures.

Biography 
Éric Ferber was born in Étain, Meuse. Ferber developed an interest in metallurgy as a child, when he would watch a craftsman at work in an old forge near his home. He became an apprentice steelworker at 14. He often works with aluminum, stainless steel and weathering steel to create sculptures and decorative art for green spaces. In 2014, he opened up an art exhibition in Henriville, where his studio is located. In 2018, an exhibition of 89 weathered steel cubes was opened at Jardin Des Arts in Châteaubourg.

In the spring of 2020 he moved to Paimpol, where he began to create a sculpture garden which is scheduled to open in 2022.

References 

20th-century French sculptors
21st-century French sculptors
1961 births
Living people
People from Meuse (department)